Pukara (Quechua for fortress) is an archaeological site in Peru located in the Ayacucho Region, Vilcas Huaman Province, in the south of the Concepción District, near Antap'iti (Antapite). This place is also interesting as a natural viewpoint.

References

Archaeological sites in Ayacucho Region
Archaeological sites in Peru
Mountains of Ayacucho Region
Mountains of Peru